National symbols of France are emblems of the French Republic and French people, and they are the cornerstone of the nation's republican tradition. 

The national symbols of the French Fifth Republic are:
 The French flag
 The national anthem: "La Marseillaise"
 The national personification: Marianne
 The national motto: Liberté, égalité, fraternité (Liberty, equality, fraternity)
 The national day: Bastille Day (celebrated on 14 July)
 The Gallic rooster
 The lictor's fasces emblem
 The Great Seal of France

Other French symbols include:
 The cockade of France
 The letters "RF", standing for République Française (French Republic)
 The National Order of the Legion of Honour and the National Order of Merit
 The Phrygian cap
 Joan of Arc
Fleur-de-lis

Flag 

The French flag is a tricolour that consists of three vertical stripes of equal width, coloured in royal blue, white, and red. It is the only official French emblem, according to article 2 of the current Constitution of France, adopted in 1958.

Fleurs-de-lis

Anthem 

The national anthem "La Marseillaise" was composed by Rouget de Lisle in 1792.

Marianne 

Marianne is the national personification of the French Republic. An embodiment of liberty and reason, and a portrayal of the Goddess of Liberty, her bust is present in every city hall in France. Her face is also drawn on stamps. The name Marianne enabled the French people to take over the newborn republic, by creating a popular figure with whom French people could easily identify.

Gallic rooster 

The choice of the Gallic rooster as a symbol for France dates to the Middle Ages. It finds its origin in a play on the word gallus (Latin for rooster) and Gallus (Gallic). Despite its frequent use as a symbol for France, in particular by sports federations, the rooster has never been an official emblem. Cocorico! (French for 'cock-a-doodle-doo') is often used as an affirmation of French patriotism.

Great Seal 

The Great Seal of France (French: Grand sceau de la République française) is the official seal of the French Republic. The seal features Liberty personified as a seated Juno wearing a crown with seven arches. She holds a fasces and is supported by a ship's tiller with a cock printed on it. At her feet is a vase with the letters "SU" (Suffrage Universel''', French for 'universal suffrage'). At her right, in the background, are symbols of the arts (painter's tools), architecture (Ionic order), education (burning lamp), agriculture (a sheaf of wheat) and industry (a cog wheel). The scene is surrounded by the legend RÉPUBLIQUE FRANÇAISE, DÉMOCRATIQUE, UNE ET INDIVISIBLE (French Republic, democratic, one and indivisible) and 24 FEV.1848 (24 February 1848) at the bottom.

The reverse bears the words AU NOM DU PEUPLE FRANÇAIS (In the name of the French people) surrounded by a crown of oak (a symbol of perennity) and laurel (a symbol of glory) leaves tied together with weed and grapes (for agriculture and wealth), and the circular national motto LIBERTÉ, ÉGALITÉ, FRATERNITÉ''.

Diplomatic emblem 

The lictor's fasces emblem was adopted by the French Foreign Ministry as a symbol for use by French diplomatic and consular missions in 1913, using a design by the sculptor Jules-Clément Chaplain. The emblem also appears on the cover of French passports.

Coat of arms 

The current coat of arms of France has been a French symbol since 1905, but it does not have the status of a national coat of arms.

Cockade 

The cockade of France is the national ornament of France, obtained by circularly pleating a blue, white and red ribbon. It is composed of the three colors of the French flag with blue in the center, white immediately outside and red on the edge.

Other RF and tricolour-based emblems

Historical emblems

1940–1944

See also
 Symbolism in the French Revolution

References